Rex King may refer to:
 Rex King (wrestler) (1961–2017), pseudonym of American professional wrestler Timothy A. Smith
 Rex King, a minor character from American adventure comic strip The Phantom